Marlon Ritter (born 15 October 1994) is a German professional footballer who plays as a forward for  side 1. FC Kaiserslautern.

References

External links
 
 

1994 births
Living people
Footballers from Essen
Association football forwards
German footballers
Borussia Mönchengladbach II players
Fortuna Düsseldorf players
Fortuna Düsseldorf II players
SC Paderborn 07 players
1. FC Kaiserslautern players
2. Bundesliga players
3. Liga players
Regionalliga players